Diallomus fuliginosus, is a species of spider of the genus Diallomus. It is endemic to Sri Lanka.

See also
 List of Ctenidae species

References

Ctenidae
Endemic fauna of Sri Lanka
Spiders of Asia
Spiders described in 1897